Pseudomonas azotifigens is a Gram-negative, nitrogen-fixing bacterium isolated from a compost pile in Japan.

References

External links
Type strain of Pseudomonas azotifigens at BacDive -  the Bacterial Diversity Metadatabase

Pseudomonadales
Bacteria described in 2005